Minor Victories  is the self-titled debut studio album by British alternative rock supergroup Minor Victories. It was released on 3 June 2016 on Fat Possum Records and PIAS Recordings.

Accolades

Track listing

Personnel
Rachel Goswell – vocals, guitar
Stuart Braithwaite – guitar, backing vocals
Justin Lockey – guitar, electronics, keyboards
James Lockey - bass
Mark Kozelek – vocals on "For You Always"
James Alexander Graham – vocals on "Scattered Ashes (Song for Richard)"

References 

2016 debut albums
Minor Victories albums
Fat Possum Records albums
PIAS Recordings albums